Xanthorhoe saturata is a moth of the  family Geometridae.

References 

Geometridae
Moths described in 1857